Enrique Hill (‘Halm Enrique’ \'h&lm en-'ri-ke\) is the ice-free hill rising to 156 m in Dospey Heights on the Ray Promontory of Byers Peninsula, Livingston Island in the South Shetland Islands, Antarctica. It surmounts Barclay Bay to the east and northeast, and Diomedes Lake on the southeast

The feature is part of the Antarctic Specially Protected Area ASPA 126 Byers Peninsula, situated in one of its restricted zones.

The hill is named after the  Jordi Enrique from Juan Carlos I Base who, together with Francesc Sàbat, made the first ascent of the island's summit Mount Friesland (1700 m) on 30 December 1991.

Location 
Spanish mapping in 1992, and Bulgarian in 2009 and 2017.

Maps 
 Península Byers, Isla Livingston. Mapa topográfico a escala 1:25000. Madrid: Servicio Geográfico del Ejército, 1992.
 L.L. Ivanov et al. Antarctica: Livingston Island and Greenwich Island, South Shetland Islands. Scale 1:100000 topographic map. Sofia: Antarctic Place-names Commission of Bulgaria, 2005.
 L.L. Ivanov. Antarctica: Livingston Island and Greenwich, Robert, Snow and Smith Islands. Scale 1:120000 topographic map.  Troyan: Manfred Wörner Foundation, 2009.  
 Antarctic Digital Database (ADD). Scale 1:250000 topographic map of Antarctica. Scientific Committee on Antarctic Research (SCAR). Since 1993, regularly upgraded and updated.
 L.L. Ivanov. Antarctica: Livingston Island and Smith Island. Scale 1:100000 topographic map. Manfred Wörner Foundation, 2017.

Notes

References 
 Bulgarian Antarctic Gazetteer. Antarctic Place-names Commission. (details in Bulgarian, basic data in English)
 Enrique Hill. SCAR Composite Gazetteer of Antarctica

External links
 Enrique Hill. Copernix satellite image

Hills of Livingston Island
Hills of Antarctica
Bulgaria and the Antarctic
Spain and the Antarctic